Seán Dillon (born 30 July 1983) is an Irish professional footballer who plays as a defender for Montrose, where he is a player-coach. He previously played for Dundee United and Irish teams Longford Town and Shelbourne in the League of Ireland prior to joining Dundee United in January 2007 then Montrose in June 2017. He has represented the Republic of Ireland at under-16,
under-21 and B international level.

Club career
Dillon was a youth player with Aston Villa but moved back to Ireland in 2002 with Longford Town, where he won two FAI Cups and a League of Ireland Cup during his four years at Flancare Park. In 2006, he moved to Shelbourne and helped them to their thirteenth league championship win, also scoring the only goal of the game in Shels' Intertoto Cup win in Lithuania over FK Vėtra. In January 2007, Dillon moved to Scottish side Dundee United for an undisclosed fee.

In March 2008 he collected a Scottish League Cup runners-up medal despite being an unused substitute in the final. However, on 15 May 2010, he was then a part of the Dundee United team who defeated Ross County 3–0 to lift the Scottish Cup at Hampden Park.

Not long after the beginning of the 2012–13 season Dillon signed a contract extension that would keep him at the club until May 2015. He was then appointed club captain by manager Jackie McNamara for the 2013–14 season.

On 30 June 2017, it was announced that Dillon had signed a two-year contract as a player-coach with Montrose. In the 2017–18 season Dillon didn’t miss a game, as the gable endies clinched the Scottish League 2 title by one point. In 2019, Dillon signed a contract extension keeping him at Montrose until summer 2021, with manager Stewart Petrie crediting him with having a "huge influence on the teams success" since his arrival. In December 2022, Dillon agreed a one-year extension with Montrose which would keep him with the Gable Endies until 2024.

International career
Dillon represented the Republic of Ireland Under-16 team at the 2000 UEFA European Under-16 Football Championship and is a former Republic of Ireland under-21 international who represented his country at the 2003 FIFA World Youth Championship, appearing as a substitute in the second round exit.
Dillon also represented the Republic of Ireland under-21 team on one occasion and played alongside United teammate Noel Hunt for the Ireland B team in October 2007 in a match against Scotland who included teammate Darren Dods.

Career statistics

Honours
Longford Town
FAI Cup: 2003, 2004
League of Ireland Cup: 2004

Shelbourne
League of Ireland: 2006

Dundee United
Scottish Cup: 2009–10
Scottish League Challenge Cup: 2016–17

Montrose

Scottish League Two: 2017–18

References

External links

 

1983 births
Living people
Association footballers from Dublin (city)
Republic of Ireland association footballers
Republic of Ireland youth international footballers
Republic of Ireland under-21 international footballers
Republic of Ireland B international footballers
League of Ireland players
Longford Town F.C. players
Shelbourne F.C. players
Dundee United F.C. players
Montrose F.C. players
Scottish Premier League players
Expatriate footballers in Scotland
Association football fullbacks
Scottish Professional Football League players
Cherry Orchard F.C. players